Geoffrey Lionel “Geoff” Iden (8 October 1914 – 12 January 1991) was a British middle- and long-distance runner who had his biggest successes in the marathon.  He finished 9th in the 1952 Olympic Games marathon, where he was the first and only Briton to finish and ran a then personal best of 2 hours 30 minutes and 42 seconds, and sixth in the European Athletics Championships of 1954.

Iden ran for the Victoria Park Harriers athletics club and his club record marathon time of 2 hours 25 minutes and 51 seconds in 1956 stood for more than fifty years, not being surpassed until September 2008.  It is still a Masters record for the club as Iden was in his forties at the time.  He was the first member of Victoria Park Harriers to take part in an Olympics. He was born in Stepney, London and died in Southend-on-Sea, Essex.

References

1914 births
1991 deaths
People from Stepney
Athletes from London
English male marathon runners
Olympic athletes of Great Britain
Athletes (track and field) at the 1952 Summer Olympics